SS City of Bedford was a British cargo steamship. She was launched in 1924 in Sunderland for Hall Line Ltd of Liverpool, a member of the Ellerman Lines group.

In December 1940 City of Bradford collided in fog the North Atlantic with another British cargo ship, . Both ships sank, and 48 of City of Bedfords crew were killed.

She was the first of two Ellerman Lines ships to be called City of Bedford. The second was a steam turbine ship that Alexander Stephen and Sons launched in 1950 and Ellerman Lines sold in 1972.

Details
William Gray & Company built City of Bradford at the former Ellerman, Gray, Inchcape and Strick (EGIS) shipyard in Sunderland on the River Wear. She was launched on 17 July 1924 and completed that October.

William Gray and Company's Central Marine Engine Works in West Hartlepool built her quadruple-expansion engine, which was rated at 728 NHP.

In 1933 Hall Line had a Bauer-Wach exhaust steam turbine added. Exhaust steam from the low-pressure cylinder of her piston engine drove the turbine. The turbine drove the same shaft as her piston engine by double-reduction gearing and a Föttinger fluid coupling.

The exhaust turbine increased City of Bedfords fuel efficiency.

By 1935 City of Bedford had been fitted with wireless direction finding and an echo sounding device.

Second World War service
In the Second World War City of Bedford traded between India, Burma, Ceylon, and the east coast of Canada and the United States. She usually sailed unescorted.

On her trips between the Indian Ocean and North America, City of Bedford usually went via Port of Cape Town, except in February 1940 when she made an eastbound trip via the Mediterranean and the Suez Canal. In May, July and November 1940 she called in Trinidad.

In November and December 1940 City of Bedford also called at Montreal, New York, Philadelphia and Baltimore, before reaching Halifax, Nova Scotia on 16 December.

On 18 December 1940 City of Bedford left Halifax in Convoy HX 97, which was bound for Liverpool. It was the first time she had sailed in a convoy. According to one account her cargo included half a million ammunition cartridges.

On 30 December in fog 280 miles south of Iceland HX 97 ran into Convoy OB 265 coming in the opposite direction. City of Bedford collided with the Elder Dempster Lines cargo ship Bodnant, causing both ships to sink. All of Bodnants crew survived, but 48 of City of Bedfords crew were killed.

References

Bibliography

1924 ships
Cargo ships of the United Kingdom
Maritime incidents in December 1940
Ships built on the River Wear
Ships of the Ellerman Lines
Ships sunk in collisions
Steamships of the United Kingdom
World War II merchant ships of the United Kingdom
World War II shipwrecks in the Atlantic Ocean